Llaqta Qulluy (Quechua llaqta place (village, town, city, country, nation), qulluy to die out, become extinct; to fail, "extinct town", also spelled Llaccta Ccolloy, Llacta Ccolloy, Llactaccolloy) is an archaeological site in Peru on a mountain of that name. It is situated in the Huancavelica Region, Tayacaja Province, Ahuaycha District. The site lies in the community of Llaqta Pata (Llaccta Pata), Vista Alegre, on top of the  mountain.

References 

Archaeological sites in Peru
Archaeological sites in Huancavelica Region
Mountains of Peru
Mountains of Huancavelica Region